Cairo Round Top is a mountain in Greene County, New York. It is located in the Catskill Mountains north-northwest of Lawrenceville. North Mountain is located southwest of Cairo Round Top. It is also known as "Dome Mountain", "Round Top", and "Wa-wan-te-pe-kook".

References

Mountains of Greene County, New York
Mountains of New York (state)